Marzani & Munsell (1955-1967) was an American book publisher of the mid-20th Century, based in Manhattan, which published liberal and leftist books, starting with False Witness by Harvey Matusow.

History

After release from prison in 1951, Carl Marzani joined Cameron Associates and partnered with Angus Cameron to run Liberty Book Club.  Marzani & Munsell formed as a book club (in an unclear relationship with Alexander Ector Orr Munsell, "that unusual combination of a practicing Christian and a practicing Marxist" per Carl Marzani, and son and heir of Albert Henry Munsell) and also operated what had become the Library-Prometheus Book Club. Together, the two book clubs, with some 8,000 members, published and distributed many books following their progressive ideology.

In a later interview, Marzani described his publishing house:

In 1959 when Cameron left for at job at Knopf, Marzani became president.  Marzani and Munsell publishing house "was destroyed in a mysterious fire" in 1966, ending the run of books, pamphlets, broadsheets and reprints.  Marzani later described the loss: "It destroyed our stock, our lists, everything, and we had no insurance."

Alleged espionage
According to allegations made in 1994 by Oleg Kalugin, a retired KGB officer, Marzani was a contact for the Soviet secret police agency, the KGB, while running Marzani & Munsell, and the KGB subsidized his publishing house in the 1960s. Allegedly, the amounts were $15,000 in 1960, then a two-year grant in 1961 of $55,000.

Legacy

Tamiment Library at New York University houses papers of Marzani & Munsell, whose principle correspondents include:  Angus Cameron (publisher), Herbert Aptheker, Calvin Benham Baldwin (aka "C.B. Baldwin" and "Beanie Baldin"), Cedric Belfrage, Alvah Bessie, Herbert Biberman, Harry Bridges, E. Berry Burgum, W.E.B. Du Bois, Barrows Dunham, Howard Fast, Royal France, Stefan Heym, Albert E. Kahn, Ring Lardner Jr., Doris Lessing, Walter Lowenfels, Albert Maltz, A.J. Muste, Carey McWilliams (journalist), Truman J. Nelson, Victor Perlo, Edwin B. Smith, Edgar Snow, Joseph R. Starobin, Anna Louise Strong, Harry F. Ward, and Ella Winter.

Titles

 1955:  
 False Witness
 Labor's Untold Story)
 1957:
 The open Marxism of Antonio Gramsci
 1959: 
 A visit to Soviet science
 World without war
 The doctor business
 Comrade Venka
 1960:
 Inside the Khrushchev Era
 The double bed from the feminine side
 The tragedy of American diplomacy
 The artist in society
  The flowers of Hiroshima
 The Rise of the People's Communes in China
 The world of C. Wright Mills
1961:
 The new Germany and the old Nazis
 Cuba: prophetic island
 War and peace, and the problem of Berlin
 The road from Sharpeville
 Dollars and Sense of Disarmament (1961)
 Cuba versus CIA
 1962:
 The Era of McCarthyism
 The Negro today
 The Shelter Hoax and Foreign Policy
 The political economy of growth
 The adventurers
 The military background to disarmamen
 Negroes with Guns
 China, Russia and the U.S.A.
 1963:
 War and Peace in Vietnam
 A quarter-century of un-Americana: a tragico-comical memorabilia of HUAC
 Heusinger of the Fourth Reich
 The golden fleece: selling the good life to Americans
 People with strength in Monroe, North Carolina
 Dragon pink on old white
 1964:
 The mood of the nation (November 22–29, 1963)
 Oswald: assassin or fall guy?
 Bitter end in Southeast Asia
 The Yahoos
 Goldwater-ism
 The Goldwater coloring book
 The Black Anglo-Saxons
 Soul of the Republic: The Negro Today
 1965:
 The Conscience of the Senate on the Vietnam War (1965)
 Gideon's Army
 v. 1. The components of the decision
 v. 2. The decision and the organization
 v. 3. The campaign and the vote
 Prosperity in crisis
 Peace by finesse
 A pictorial history of the Jews in the United States
 Automation
 Journey to the Soviet Trade Unions
 Storm the gates of Jericho
 What to do about Vietnam?
 1966:
 The gaps in the Warren report
 Critical reactions to the Warren report
 Concentration camps USA
 Harlem stirs
 German Hand on the Nuclear Trigger
 The Silent Slaughter
 Johnson's War

People

Officers
 Carl Marzani, President

Authors
 Charles R. Allen Jr.
 Herbert Aptheker
 Paul A. Baran
 J. D. Bernal
 Baron Blackett
 Patrick Blackett
 Phillip Bonosky
 Richard Owen Boyer
 Richard Carter
 Carl Dreher
 Barrows Dunham
 Abraham Feinberg
 Waldo David Frank
 Joseph M. Gillman
 Kumar Goshal
 Fred Halstead
 Nathan Hare
 Margot Heinemann
 Stefan Heym
 Leo Huberman
 Joachim Joesten
 Mark Lane (author)
 Martin Luther King Jr.
 Curtis D. MacDougall
 Andrew March
 Carl Marzani
 Harvey Matusow
 Eve Merriam
 Edita Morris
 Fred Warner Neal
 Truman J. Nelson
 Mike Newberry
 Pavel Nilin
 Eric Norden
 Victor Perlo
 Charlotte Pomerantz
 Bernard Sachs
 Joseph J.Seldin
 Morris Schappes
 Edgar Snow
 Joseph William Still 
 Anna Louise Strong
 Paul Sweezy
 T.H. Tetens
 Robert F. Williams
 William Appleman Williams
 William Worthy
 Fred Wright (cartoonist)

Translators
 Joseph Fels Barnes
 Carl Marzani

See also
 Angus Cameron (publisher)
 Albert E. Kahn
 Albert Henry Munsell
 Little, Brown and Company
 Alfred A. Knopf
 Boni & Liveright
 Dial Press

Notes
 Harvey Matusow's False Witness.
 Robert F. Williams' Negroes with Guns.
 Referring to Ring Lardner Jr.

References

External links
 Correspondence letter dated January 1962 with Leo Szilard at the University of California at San Diego (UCSD)
 Advertising letter dated June 1968
 Tamiment Library - Series VI: Publishing: Cameron Associations, Marzani & Munsell, 1953-1970
 Open Library = Marzani & Munsell

Book publishing companies of the United States
Book publishing companies based in New York (state)
Publishing companies based in New York City
Publishing companies established in 1954
1954 establishments in New York City
Publishing companies disestablished in the 1960s